Motootua is a settlement in Samoa. It is home to the Tupua Tamasese Meaʻole Hospital.

References 

Populated places in Samoa